Zağnosspor is a multi-sports club established in Trabzon, Turkey. The club is active in the branches football, men's and women's handball, volleyball, boxing and swimming. The club is named after Zağnos Pasha ( fl. 1446–1462 or 1469), who served as the sanjak-bey of the city following the conquest of Trabzon by the Ottoman Turks in 1461. Its colors are red, blue and white. Club president is Emre Aksoy. Aksoy is a well known businessman in Turkey and the board chairman of AKS Group Construction. http://www.aksgrupinsaat.com/ 

The club is best known for their women's handball team playing in the Turkish Women's Handball Super League.

References